Athani Taluk is the largest taluk in Belgaum District, Karnataka, India. This includes 4 towns, 115 inhabited villages and hamlets with a rural population of 4,07,485, according to the 2011 census. The total population of the taluk is 5,25,832. It is bounded by Sangli District of Maharashtra in the north, Bijapur District in the east, and Bagalkot District in the southeast. Geologically the area is covered by Deccan Trap formations. Two rivers flow through the taluk: the Krishna River and the Agrani.

The four largest towns of Athani Taluk (in decreasing order of population) are Athani, Ugar, Ainapur and Shedbal. Five sugar industries are in this taluk, located in the towns of Athani, Kagwad, Kokatnur, Ugar and Kempwad. There are four hobalis in the taluk: Athani, Kagwad, Telsang and Antapur.

Educational institutions
Athani has government and primary schools for boys and girls in Kannada, Urdu and Marathi Medium.

Agriculture
Agriculture is the main occupation in Athani. The main crops are jawar, wheat, sunflower, toordal, green Moong and kushbi. The commercial crops include grapes, cotton and sugarcane. Athani is one of the largest sugarcane cultivation taluks in Karnataka.

The Krishna River flows  around the southern part of the taluk. The irrigation facilities of the Upper Krishna Project's Hipparagi dam are in Athani taluk. As part of the Hipparagi project canals were constructed in Athani, assisting the cultivation of sugarcane, grapes and other crops. 70% of the land in the taluk is fertile land.

Industries
The first sugar industry in Athani taluk was started by Ugar Sugars in Ugar, followed by Krishna Co-operative Sugars in Athani and Renuka Sugars in Kokatnur.

Ugar Sugars produces the most sugar in Karnataka, more than 12,000 tonnes. All the industries in the taluk together produce more than 35,000 tonnes of sugar.

Athani Taluk is home to five of the twenty sugar industries in Belagavi District:
Krishna Co-operative Sugar Industry (Athani)
Ugar Sugars Pvt Limited (Ugar)
Renuka Sugars Pvt Limited (Kokatnur)
Shiraguppi Sugars Industry (Kagwad)
Farmers Co-operative Sugar Industry (Kempwad)

Notable people
Laxman Savadi, DCM of Karnataka government
Sampat Shivangi, Awardee, Pravasi Bharatiya Samman
Sudheendra Kulkarni, Former Director of Operations to the Prime Ministers Office during the term of Atal Bihari Vajapayee

References

External links
 
 591304
 Athani Taluka Profile at Karnataka Information Centre

Taluks of Karnataka